Hadeland Folkemuseum is a regional museum for Hadeland (Gran, Lunner and Jevnaker). It was founded in 1913, and is located in Tingelstad in Gran. The museum is situated along Kongevegen (The King's Road), the road from Oslo to Bergen  which passes through Hadeland.  Hadeland Folkemuseum is a subsidiary of Randsfjordmuseene,  a regional institution which also manages Lands Museum and the Kittilbu Open-Air Museum in Vestre Gausdal.

Overview
Hadeland Folkemuseum is an open-air museum containing more than 30 buildings from the 17th to the 20th centuries. All the items in the museum are original and have been collected from various farms and other locations in the area. The Documentation Center for Hadeland consist of photographs, archive, objects from Hadeland and a library. Hadeland Folkemuseum has a collection of  farm implements as well as  a copy of the Dynna stone which dates from the 11th century. The Dynna stone originated in Gran but was relocated to the Norwegian Museum of Cultural History in Oslo in 1879.

Hadeland Folkemuseum is located near Tingelstad old church (Tingelstad gamle kirke) also known as St. Petri Church. The Romanesque stone church was built around 1220 and known for its intact interior from the 16th and 17th century.

Granske Kompagni, a local regiment in Gran municipality during the 16th and 17th century, had its exercise ground nearby at Granavollen. The regimental arsenal building or Tent house (Telthus)  has been relocated to Hadeland Folkemuseum.

Located within the museum area is Halvdanshaugen, the reputed grave of a local king from the Viking Age. Halvdanshaugen, (from the Old Norse word haugr meaning mound) is one of several burial sites attributed to  Halfdan the Black.

See also
 Lands Museum

References

Sources
 Østby, Leif Norges Kunsthistorie  (1977)
 Bugge, Dr. Anders Hadeland Bygdebok  (1932)

External links
 Official website

Museums established in 1913
Hadeland
Museums in Innlandet
Open-air museums in Norway
Culture in Innlandet
Folk museums in Norway
1913 establishments in Norway